The National Winter Ales Festival (NWAF) is organised annually by the Campaign for Real Ale (CAMRA). From 2018 it was marketed as Great British Beer Festival Winter. The event showcases real ales available in the UK in the winter months, especially strong ales, stouts and porters. It was first held in 1997, alongside the Great British Beer Festival. Great British Beer Festival Winter is also home to the Champion Winter Beer of Britain awards.

Host city and date 
The festival is generally held in January or February of each year; however there were two festivals in 1997, one at each end of the year. The first one gave the awards for 1996/7 and the second for 1997/8; there was no festival in 1998.

While the summer event has been exclusive to London since 1991, the Great British Beer Festival Winter moves between host cities, allocated on 3-year cycle.  Branches of CAMRA around the United Kingdom bid for the event.  Derby was the host city for 2014 to 2016 where the event was held at the Roundhouse.  The final Derby festival drew 13,832 attendees, the largest in the event's history.  They drank a combined 57,000 pints of the 470 beers on offer.

Norwich and Norfolk CAMRA hosted the event in 2017, 2018 and 2019, at The Halls, a medieval complex in Norwich consisting of St Andrew's Hall and Blackfriars' Hall.

Venues 
 1997 - Old Fruit Market, Glasgow
 1999 - Upper Campfield Market, Manchester
 2000 - Upper Campfield Market, Manchester
 2001 - Upper Campfield Market, Manchester
 2002 - Upper Campfield Market, Manchester
 2003 - Old Town Hall, Burton-on-Trent
 2004 - Old Town Hall, Burton-on-Trent
 2005 - New Century Hall, Manchester
 2006 - New Century Hall, Manchester
 2007 - New Century Hall, Manchester
 2008 - New Century Hall, Manchester
 2009 - New Century Hall, Manchester
 2010 - Sheridan Suite, Manchester
 2011 - Sheridan Suite, Manchester
 2012 - Sheridan Suite, Manchester
 2013 - Sheridan Suite, Manchester
 2014 - The Roundhouse, Derby
 2015 - The Roundhouse, Derby
 2016 - The Roundhouse, Derby
 2017 - The Halls, Norwich
 2018 - The Halls, Norwich
 2019 - The Halls, Norwich
 2020 - The New Bingley Hall, Birmingham
 2021 - The New Bingley Hall, Birmingham Cancelled due to COVID-19 pandemic
 2022 - The New Bingley Hall, Birmingham Cancelled due to COVID-19 pandemic
 2023 - Burton Town Hall, Burton upon Trent at Burton Beer Festival 2023

References

External links 

CAMRA

Winter festivals in the United Kingdom
Beer festivals in the United Kingdom
1997 establishments in the United Kingdom
Festivals established in 1997
Annual events in the United Kingdom